Majors Creek is a locality split between the City of Townsville and the Shire of Burdekin, Queensland, Australia.

Geography 
The locality lies on the plain to the south of Mount Elliot. It is bounded by Haughton River to the east, Major Creek to the south and an unnamed creek to the west. 

 Major Creek Mountain in the east of the locality at 
 Artillery Hill in the centre of the locality at 
 South Double in the centre of the locality at

History 
Major's Creek State School opened on 9 February 1934. It was mothballed on 31 December 2008 when enrolments were under 10 students. It closed on 31 December 2009. In 2012, when the school's land and buildings were to sold, a reunion was held at the school to dig up the time capsule buried in 1984 to celebrate the school's 50th anniversary. The school was at 54 Majors Creek Road. It sold in May 2012 for $264,000.

Economy 
Majors Creek Homestead is in the east of the locality.

Education 
There are no schools in Majors Creek. The nearest primary schools are Woodstock State School in neighbouring Woodstock to the west, Giru State School in Giru to the north-east and Clare State School in Clare to the south-east. The nearest secondary schools are William Ross State High School in Annandale in Townsville to the north-west, Ayr State High School in Ayr to the north-east, and Home Hill State High School in Home Hill to the east.

References

Suburbs of Townsville
Shire of Burdekin
Localities in Queensland